The men's singles squash competition at the 2022 World Games took place from 13 to 17 July 2022 at the University of Alabama Birmingham in Birmingham, United States.

Competition format
A total of 28 athletes entered the competition. Players competed in classic cup system.

Seeds

Results

References 

Squash at the 2022 World Games